Diplacus brevipes is a species of monkeyflower known by the common name widethroat yellow monkeyflower. It was formerly known as Mimulus brevipes.

Distribution
It is native to the Transverse and Peninsular Ranges and other mountains and foothills of southern California and Baja California. Diplacus brevipes grows in chaparral, especially open areas such as those recently cleared by wildfire.

Description
Diplacus brevipes is a hairy annual herb producing an erect stem reaching maximum heights anywhere between 5 and 80 centimeters tall. The paired opposite leaves are lance-shaped to oval and are up to 9 centimeters long.

The tubular throat of the flower is encapsulated in a hairy calyx of sepals up to 2.5 centimeters long with pointed tips, some longer than others. The bright yellow flower corolla is up to 3 centimeters long with five lobes at the mouth, two on the upper lip and three on the lower.

References

External links
Jepson Manual Treatment — Mimulus brevipes
USDA Plants Profile
Mimulus brevipes — Photo gallery

brevipes
Flora of California
Flora of Baja California
Natural history of the California chaparral and woodlands
Natural history of the Channel Islands of California
Natural history of the Peninsular Ranges
Natural history of the Santa Monica Mountains
Natural history of the Transverse Ranges
Flora without expected TNC conservation status